Cryptolechia pentathlopa is a moth in the family Depressariidae. It was described by Edward Meyrick in 1933. It is found in Brazil.

References

Moths described in 1933
Cryptolechia (moth)
Taxa named by Edward Meyrick